Meliton or Melitón is a given name. Notable people with the name include:

Melitón Carvajal (1847–1935), Peruvian military and political figure
Melitón Manzanas (1906–1968), high-ranking police officer in Francoist Spain killed by ETA paramilitaries
Meliton Balanchivadze (1862–1937), Georgian composer of classical music
Meliton Kantaria (1920–1993), Georgian sergeant of the Soviet Army who hoisted a Soviet flag Banner of Victory over the Reichstag in 1945
Meliton, Metropolitan of Chalcedon (1913–1989), Greek Orthodox bishop
Melito of Sardis, Bishop of Sardis in the 2nd century

See also
Estadio Meliton Dubon, stadium located in Macuelizo, Santa Barbara
Melitón Albáñez Domínguez Airstrip (IATA: N/A) is a dirt airstrip located in Ejido Melitón Albáñez Domíngez, Mexico
Meliton, a novella by Ivan Bunin published in 1901